Boldóczki is a Hungarian surname. Notable people with the surname include:

Gábor Boldoczki (born 1976), Hungarian classical trumpeter
János Boldóczki (1912–1988), Hungarian politician

Hungarian-language surnames